Levi Horace Bancroft (December 26, 1861September 5, 1948) was an American lawyer and progressive Republican politician from Richland County, Wisconsin.  He was the 20th attorney general of Wisconsin, the 43rd speaker of the Wisconsin State Assembly, and United States Attorney for the Eastern District of Wisconsin.  He also served as a Wisconsin circuit court judge and district attorney.

Biography
Levi H. Bancroft was born on December 26, 1861, to George I. and Helen M. Bancroft; reports have differed on the location. He attended high school in Lone Rock, Wisconsin, and later became a teacher. In 1884, he graduated from the University of Wisconsin Law School. On June 11, 1890, Bancroft married Myrtle DeLap. From 1907 to 1913, he was a judge advocate of what is now the Wisconsin Army National Guard.

He died at his farm near Richland Center on September 5, 1948.

Political career
Bancroft served as the District Attorney of Richland County, Wisconsin, from 1886 to 1888, Richland Center, Wisconsin City Attorney for six years, and City Supervisor. From 1897 to 1902, he was a county judge of Richland County. Bancroft was a delegate to the 1900 Republican National Convention. In addition, he was delegate to a number of State Republican Conventions. He would serve as an Assistant Attorney General. Bancroft was a member of the Wisconsin State Assembly from 1907 to 1910, serving as Speaker in 1909-1910. He did not run for the Assembly in 1910, and was succeeded by fellow Republican Chris Monson.

In 1910, he was elected Attorney General of Wisconsin, with 114,939 votes to 104,551 for Democrat John Doherty; 48,693 for "Progressive Republican" Charles Crownhart, and 39,399 for Social Democrat Gerrit Thorn, Jr.

He was a Wisconsin Circuit Court judge. Sources are varied over his length of service. Later, he served as a U.S. Attorney in Wisconsin from 1927 to 1932. From 1934 to 1936, Bancroft was Mayor of Richland Center. He was again a county judge of Richland County from 1938 to 1948.

See also
List of attorneys general of Wisconsin

References

External links
The Political Graveyard

1861 births
1948 deaths
People from Richland Center, Wisconsin
Wisconsin Attorneys General
District attorneys in Wisconsin
Wisconsin city attorneys
Wisconsin state court judges
County judges in the United States
Republican Party members of the Wisconsin State Assembly
Mayors of places in Wisconsin
Military personnel from Wisconsin
National Guard (United States) officers
Schoolteachers from Wisconsin
United States Attorneys for the Eastern District of Wisconsin
University of Wisconsin Law School alumni